Anne Le Marquand Hartigan was an Irish poet, playwright and painter.

Personal life
Hartigan trained as a painter at Reading University, England. She returned to Co. Louth, Ireland, in 1962 with her husband Tim Hartigan where they farmed and reared their six children. She now lives in Dublin.

Poetry 
Hartigan has published seven collections of poetry: Unsweet Dreams (Salmon Poetry, 2011), To Keep The Light Burning: Reflections in Times of Loss (Salmon Poetry, 2008); Nourishment (Salmon Poetry, 2005); Immortal Sins (Salmon Poetry, 1993); the award-winning long poem with Anne's drawings, Now is a Moveable Feast (Salmon Poetry, 1991); Return Single (Beaver Row Press, 1986); Long Tongue (Beaver Row Press, 1982).

Theatre 
Hartigan's theatre piece Beds  was first performed at the Damer Theatre in 1982 as part of the Dublin Theatre Festival. Hartigan's full length tragi-comedy I do like to be beside the seaside is set in an old peoples home. Hartigan won the Mobil Prize for Playwriting for her play The Secret Game (Chiswick books, 2014) in 1995. In Other Worlds (2003) was commissioned and performed by Ohio University, USA, then performed at the Edinburgh Festival Fringe and in New Zealand. Jersey Lilies  was performed at the Samuel Beckett Theatre, Dublin 1996, where Hartigan acted and directed with Robert Gordon. La Corbiere (Carysfort Press, 2001) was performed at the Project Theatre as part of the Dublin Theatre Festival in 1989 and has since been performed in Beirut, Lebanon in 2004 and by Solas Nua Theatre Company in Washington DC, 2006.

Prose 
Hartigan's prose work includes Clearing The Space: A Why of Writing (Salmon, 1996).

References

External links 
 www.annehartigan.ie
 http://www.chiswickbooks.com
 http://www.carysfortpress.com
 http://www.salmonpoetry.com/ 
 www.irishwriters-online.com
 Facebook: Anne Le Marquand Hartigan
 Anne Le Marquand Hartigan reads Care - a Charm on Youtube
 Portrait of the artist as a poet and playwright too, Irish Times 2017

21st-century Irish poets
21st-century Irish writers
Living people
Irish women poets
Irish women dramatists and playwrights
21st-century Irish women writers
Place of birth missing (living people)
Alumni of the University of Reading
Year of birth missing (living people)